In mathematics, an Euler system is a collection of compatible elements of Galois cohomology groups indexed by fields. Euler systems are named after Leonhard Euler because  the factors relating different elements of an Euler system resemble the Euler factors of an Euler product.

Euler systems can be used to construct annihilators of ideal class groups or Selmer groups, thus giving bounds on their orders, which in turn has led to deep theorems such as the finiteness of some Tate-Shafarevich groups. This led to Karl Rubin's new proof of the main conjecture of Iwasawa theory, considered simpler than the original proof due to Barry Mazur and Andrew Wiles.

Definition
Although there are several definitions of special sorts of Euler system, there seems to be no published  definition of an Euler system that covers all known cases. But it is possible to say roughly what an Euler system is, as follows: 
An Euler system is given by collection of elements cF. These elements are often indexed by certain number fields F containing some fixed number field K, or by something closely related such as square-free integers. The elements cF are typically elements of  some Galois cohomology group such as H1(F, T) where T is a p-adic representation of the absolute Galois group of K.
The most important condition is that the elements cF and cG for two different fields F ⊆ G are related by a simple formula, such as

Here the "Euler factor" P(τ|B;x) is defined to be the element det(1-τx|B) considered as an element of O[x], which when x happens to act on B is not the same as det(1-τx|B) considered as an element of O.
There may be other conditions that the cF have to satisfy, such as congruence conditions.

Kazuya Kato refers to the elements in an Euler system as "arithmetic incarnations of zeta" and describes the property of being an Euler system as "an arithmetic reflection of the fact that these incarnations are related to special values of Euler products".

Examples

Cyclotomic units
For every square-free positive integer n pick an n-th root ζn of 1, with ζmn = ζmζn for m,n coprime. Then the cyclotomic Euler system is the set of numbers 
αn = 1 − ζn. These satisfy the relations

 modulo all primes above l
where l is a prime not dividing n and Fl is a Frobenius automorphism with Fl(ζn) = ζ.
Kolyvagin used this Euler system to give an elementary proof of the Gras conjecture.

Gauss sums

Elliptic units

Heegner points
Kolyvagin constructed an Euler system from the Heegner points of an elliptic curve, and used this to show that in some cases the Tate-Shafarevich group is finite.

Kato's Euler system
Kato's Euler system consists of certain elements occurring in the algebraic K-theory of modular curves.

Notes

References
 

  
 

. Proceedings of the congress held in Madrid, August 22–30, 2006

External links
 Several papers on Kolyvagin systems are available at Barry Mazur's web page (as of July 2005).

Algebraic number theory